CHANGE is a Japanese television drama which aired on Fuji TV starting May 12, 2008.

Plot
Keita Asakura, an elementary school teacher who has no interest in politics, suddenly gets taken to the position of the Prime Minister. He is forced to campaign in the Fukuoka Prefecture for a seat in the House of Representatives for the Seiyu Party when his father and brother, both involved in Diet politics, die in a plane crash en route from Vietnam. Asakura wins the prefectural elections, and heads to Tokyo to take his father's place in the House.

After being sworn in, Asakura is dubbed the "Prince of the Parliament" (kokukai ouji) by the news media. The current Prime Minister is embroiled in a sexual harassment scandal and resigns, leading Kanbaya, one of the most senior politicians in the Seiyu Party, to propose that Asakura run for the party's leadership. This puts Asakara in the running for the premiership should the Seiyu Party win a majority in an upcoming general election. Nirasawa and Hikaru arrives in Tokyo from Fukuoka and stays over at his residence, in time becoming his trusted aides.

One night, Asakura escapes from the Prime Minister's residence at night and goes to his parents' house, conducting research on the Yakushima affair with the help of Nirasawa and Hikaru. He promises Miyama that he will not neglect his official duties. Onoda, a senior Seiyu politician involved in the Yakushima affair, is asked by Kanbaya to dissuade Asakura's crusade against the dam. However, Onoda comes to respect Asakura and ultimately helps him. Asakura apologises to the public at a press conference and vows to compensate all those affected by the dam.

Cast
Takuya Kimura as Keita Asakura
Eri Fukatsu as Rika Miyama
Hiroshi Abe as Katsutoshi Nirasawa
Akira Terao as Masaichi Kanbayashi
Rosa Kato as Hikaru Miyamoto

Reception
CHANGE began okay with a 23.8% rating on its first episode. As the week progressed, the rating dropped to below 20%, which is unusual for a Japanese television drama. It hit 31.2% at 22:15 during the 60-minute extended finale episode.

The single episode ratings are as follows:

Special campaign
Takuya Kimura is currently appearing in Toyota's commercial. Collaborating with Toyota, there will be a quiz after every episode, and the "Change" original car "STAR Fielder" made by Toyota (model based on Corolla Fielder) will be given to one of the viewers. From May 12, 2008, Takuya will continue appearing in Toyota's commercial but as Keita Asakura, this drama's character. On 10 and 12 May, two specials will be broadcast prior to the premiere, and Takuya and Eri Fukatsu will appear live on Mezamashi Terebi, Toku Dane!, and Waratte Iitomo (only Takuya), promoting the drama.

International broadcast

External links
 Official Website

References

Japanese drama television series
Political drama television series
2008 Japanese television series debuts
2008 Japanese television series endings
Television shows written by Yasushi Fukuda
Fuji TV dramas